(Italian, "knotted lace") is type of lace made without bobbins (weights). It originated in Italy, possibly Milan, in the 16th century and usually incorporated geometric patterns. It is the precursor to bobbin lace. Remaining samples of this lace are rare.

 was typically used for edging. Although related to macramé, which is knotted by hand,  was likely created with a needle.

References

Lace
Textile arts of Italy